Vincent Cespedes (born 14 September 1973 in Aubervilliers, Seine-Saint-Denis) is a French philosopher, writer and composer.

He is the author of essays on various subjects, and he published a novel on Cheikh Anta Diop and Panafricanism philosophy, set in the context of relations between Africa and the West. Since 2008 he has directed a collection which he created at Larousse editions: "Philosopher" ("Philosophize"). 
He is also a painter, a pianist, a rapper and a composer.

Works

Activities 
He gives conferences in France and abroad, intervening notably in the circles of the hospital (clinical research ethics, psychiatry), of companies and institutions.

He is among "the young guard" in a ranking conducted by L'OBS on the "50 Stars of Thought", as well as among the nine portraits of "intellectuals of the twenty-first century" brushed by Le Journal du Dimanche.

Regular guest of the Solidays music festival organised by Solidarité sida (a French AIDS awareness group for youth), he participated in the launch of "Printemps Solidaire" at the Zénith Paris on 1 February 2017, in front of 6,000 spectators.

He had practiced Kung-Fu for 20 years and was stunt performer in Brotherhood of the Wolf (Christophe Gans, 2001), directed by Philip Kwok.

He is also a pianist and composer. His first rap EP, under the alias VIINCΞ, "Microliberté", was released on 13 October 2017 on Recordless Company record label.

Direct Philosophy 
In 2016, he organizes about ten times a month video sessions on Facebook Live to interact directly with Internet users connected to the themes that they suggest; an exercise which he calls "balbutiement" (″stammering″).

It is also thanks to the exploration of this technology that he creates and animates the first role-playing game in Facebook live video, Primate Joke: a meditation on the future of humanity and modern democracies, where emotions and thought are taken care of by monkeys-cyborgs, the "Cymians".

With these experiences, he created "Dream Tanks" in August 2016: citizen agoravideos in which Internet users (called "Editors") seize a theme and interact with their "co-drivers" (users connected) . This initiative of "direct philosophy" will produce fifty Dream Tanks from the first month, by publishers from 17 to 73 years, from all origins and around the world (France, Peru, Thailand, China). In a year, the number of Dream Tanks will be 450.

Tintin Gate 
On 19 September 2017, he launched on his Facebook Page an absurd but well-argued idea, clearly stamped "Fake news", which will trigger the "Tintin Gate": the idea that Tintin was always perceived as a girl for his creator, Hergé. The controversy goes around the world in less than a week. The philosopher will explain himself to Guardian: his objective was to demonstrate that the "serious" media now needed attractive "fake news" to prosper on the Internet.

New technologies 
In 2016, he created the human values test Deepro (for ″Deep Profiling″), presenting his new axiology directly in the form of a mobile app.

His philosophical tarot, Le Jeu du Phénix (″The Phoenix Game″), is also adapted for mobile app.

In 2017, with his team of French and Vietnamese developers, he launches the IMLAC project (″Intelligent Matricial Language About Concepts″), the construction of a philosophical artificial intelligence, based on his system of formalization of human behaviors, on the Lovotic of Hooman Samani, on works by Lotfi Zadeh and on swarm intelligence.

References

External links
  Official website.
  French Philosopher Urges Youth To Create 'A New Form Of Resistance' (Huffington Post, 18 November 2015)
  Televised debate on young people and contestation, 20 October 2010.
  Let's mix. Investigating Human Alchemy (presentation)
  Televised Debate, « Tomorrow, Everyone Metis ? », 13 November 2008.
  Televised lesson on the Mix Philosophy of Vincent Cespedes, October 2008
  Televised debate on Mai-68, 5 May 2008.
  Televised debate on Education, 9 September 2008.
  Televised debate on Pornography, 30 April 2007.
  « Mai 68, mon amour (May 68, My Love) » – Le Contre-journal de Libération (The Counter-Journal of Libération newspaper), November 2007 (16 minute interview).

1973 births
Living people
People from Aubervilliers
21st-century French philosophers
Continental philosophers
21st-century French novelists
French composers
French male composers
French male novelists
21st-century French male writers
French male non-fiction writers